The Puerto Rico Conservatory of Music is a public conservatory in San Juan, Puerto Rico.  It has hosted a number of international musicians as students as well as faculty, and has a longstanding relationship with the classical music movement in Puerto Rico, including the annual Casals Festival and the Puerto Rico Symphony Orchestra (PRSO).

History
Following the success of the Casals Festival held in San Juan in 1957, state legislator Ernesto Ramos Antonini proposed several laws which would create the Puerto Rico Symphony Orchestra that same year, and the Conservatory of Music in June 1959. The conservatory was originally envisioned as a school for preparing musicians for the PRSO and for preparing music teachers for the state public education system. Throughout the years, however, the conservatory has become a musical landmark in the Caribbean, providing advanced academic studies in various music areas to local students as well as international visitors.

Since its inception, the conservatory has been under the administration of state government agencies, including the Puerto Rico Industrial Development Company (Compañía de Fomento Económico), the Administration for the Encouragement of Arts and Culture (Administración para el Fomento de las Artes y Cultura), and the Musical Arts Corporation (Corporación de las Artes Musicales, or CAM). It remained a part of the CAM until 1995 when a state law granted it fiscal and administrative autonomy. Since then, the conservatory has been autonomously run by a board of trustees appointed by the Governor and confirmed by the Senate.

Academics
The conservatory offers a variety of post-secondary degrees in music, the post-graduate program offers bachelor's degrees in:musical composition, music education, voice, classical guitar, symphony instruments, jazz, Caribbean music, and piano. The graduate program consists of: master’s degrees in music education, voice, classical guitar, symphony instruments and piano, as well as artists diplomas in voice, classical guitar, symphony instruments, jazz, Caribbean music, and piano. It also offers continuing education programs, and teacher certifications. In addition to its regular academic programs, it organizes various international student exchange programs with music schools all around the world.

The Conservatory's Preparatory School offers programs for children, teenagers and adults with the purpose of encouraging music appreciation within the local community. These programs do not offer degrees or certifications, but provide basic to near expert level teaching to regular citizens who are not in its formal academic program.

Accreditations
The conservatory is accredited by various federal and state educational associations, including:

 National Association of Schools of Music
 Middle States Association of Colleges and Schools
 National Guild for Community Arts Education
 Puerto Rico Education Council

Campus

From 1960 to 2008 the Puerto Rico Conservatory of Music was located in Hato Rey, in the former facilities of an old factory. In 2009 they moved to the new facilities in the Miramar section of the island's capital.

The conservatory is composed of three main buildings:

 The Historic Building. Formerly known as Mothers of the Sacred Heart Private School (Spanish: Colegio de las Madres del Sagrado Corazón) and Miramar's Old Refuge for Girls (Spanish: Antiguo Asilo de Niñas de Miramar), is part of the United States National Register of Historic Places. The building's reconstruction lasted from 2001 to 2008, and it has been operating since 2009. It hosts the administrative offices, computer and piano labs, classrooms, practice rooms, the Luis A. Ferré Patio (north), and the Pablo Casals Patio (south).
 The parking lot and green-roof. Hosts the Rafael Hernández Amphitheater and the Laguna Plaza which offers to the academic community and visitors an incredible view of the Condado lagoon, and it's the biggest green-roof in Puerto Rico.
 The Academic Building. Inaugurated in August 2012, consists of the following facilities:
 First floor: The Amaury Veray Library, a unit of the Ángel Ramos Foundation Center for Learning Resources (Spanish: Centro de Recursos para el Aprendizaje Fundación Ángel Ramos), the Cecilia Negrón de Talavera wing, practice and rehearsal rooms.
 Second floor: The Bertita & Guillermo L. Martínez Theater (Concert and rehearsal halls: Jesús María Sanromá Concert Hall, the Anthony "Junior" Soto Hall, and the José "Pepito" Figueroa Hall), individual classrooms, practice cubicles, and lockers. 
 Third floor: More individual classrooms, practice cubicles, and lockers.

The facilities host a variety of concerts for the nearby communities featuring students, teachers, the Puerto Rico Symphony Orchestra, and famous international performers.

Affiliates
The conservatory is a participating member of various US, Puerto Rico, and international music and arts associations, including:

 American Association of Collegiate Registrars and Admission Officers
 Hispanic Association of Colleges and Universities
 Puerto Rico Association of Student Financial Aid Administrators
 American Library Association
 Music Library Association
 Puerto Rico Librarians Society (Sociedad de Bibliotecarios de Puerto Rico, in Spanish)
 International Association of Music Libraries
 ARCHIRED of Puerto Rico
 Caribbean University Research and Institutional Libraries Association
 MENC: The National Association for Music Education
 Suzuki Association of the Americas
 Kindermusik International
 Association of Fund-Raising Professionals
 International Personnel Management Association
 Steinway and Sons

References

External links
 Official website 

Miramar (Santurce)
Music schools in Puerto Rico
Education in San Juan, Puerto Rico
Government-owned corporations of Puerto Rico
Educational institutions established in 1959
Buildings and structures in San Juan, Puerto Rico
1959 establishments in Puerto Rico